Eucalyptus varia is a species of mallee that is endemic to an area near the south coast of Western Australia. It has smooth bark, narrow lance-shaped adult leaves, flower buds in groups of nine or eleven, yellow flowers and barrel-shaped to cylindrical fruit.

Description
Flowering occurs from July to September or October and the flowers are yellow.

Taxonomy and naming
The specific epithet (varia) is from the Latin word "varia", meaning "varying", referring to the varying habit, bark, leaf width and habitat of this species.

In the same journal, Brooker and Hopper described two subspecies and the names have been accepted by the Australian Plant Census:
 Eucalyptus varia subsp. salsuginosa Brooker & Hopper has rough, fibrous bark near the base and occurs on seasonally wet flats north and north-east of Esperance;
 Eucalyptus varia Brooker & Hopper subsp. varia is smooth barked throughout and occurs on sandplains and laterite, north and north-west of Esperance and as far east as the Cape Arid National Park.

Conservation status
This species of eucalypt and both subspecies are classified as "not threatened" by the Western Australian Government Department of Parks and Wildlife.

See also
List of Eucalyptus species

References

varia
Endemic flora of Western Australia
Mallees (habit)
Myrtales of Australia
Eucalypts of Western Australia
Plants described in 1991
Taxa named by Ian Brooker
Taxa named by Stephen Hopper